John Marek may refer to:
John Marek (murderer), American executed murderer
John Marek, Welsh political leader
John Marek Independent Party

cy:John Marek